Samuel Aarons (21 October 1895 – 10 January 1971) was an Australian radical activist and communist.

Early life 
He was born in Prahran, Melbourne on the 21st of October 1895, to Louis and Jane Aarons (nee Hyam), who passed on their radical politics to their son.

Biography 
Sam joined the Australian Labor Party at the age of sixteen and was an anti-war campaigner during World War I. This activism led to his sacking from his job at the Customs Department, and he was injured during a 1916 march to the Victorian Parliament. Although his parents were founding members of the Communist Party of Australia (CPA) in 1920, Sam instead established a chain of shoe repair stores in Sydney, although he did eventually join the CPA in 1930. He led a workers' delegation to the Soviet Union in 1934 and recruited a young unionist, Jim Healy, to the CPA; Healy would be one of the most significant unionists of his time. Aarons fought in the Spanish Civil War on the republican side, not leaving until the collapse of the Republic began in 1938. Returning to Australia, he remained active in communist affairs, becoming Western Australian State Secretary and a longtime member of the Central Committee. Aarons had three sons: two, Laurie and Eric, by his first wife, and a third, Gerald, by his second wife, Annette Moore.

References 

1895 births
1971 deaths
Communist Party of Australia members
Jewish socialists
People from Prahran, Victoria
Activists from Melbourne
Foreign volunteers in the Spanish Civil War